Clyde Davis Goodnight (March 3, 1924 – December 28, 2002) was an American football end in the National Football League for the Green Bay Packers and the Washington Redskins.  He played college football at the University of Tulsa and was drafted in the third round of the 1945 NFL Draft.

External links

1924 births
2002 deaths
People from Bell County, Texas
Players of American football from Texas
American football wide receivers
Tulsa Golden Hurricane football players
Green Bay Packers players
Washington Redskins players